The 2017 UST Growling Tigers men's basketball team represented University of Santo Tomas in the 80th season of the University Athletic Association of the Philippines. The men's basketball tournament for the school year 2017–18 began on September 9, 2017 and the host school for the season was Far Eastern University.

The Tigers finished eighth and last at the end of the double round-robin eliminations for the second straight year. The team went on a 17-game losing streak that dated back from Season 79, winning only their last assignment to save themselves from having a winless season.

They had a final record of 1 win against 13 losses, the worst for the team in the last 28 years. This is also a new team low in the Final Four era, beating the previous year's record of 3 wins and 11 losses.

They had an average losing margin of 13.9 points against a single 3 point win for the entire season.

Like the previous year, UST suffered three blowout losses, against the FEU Tamaraws by 26 points in the second round, and twice against the De La Salle Green Archers by 29 and 35 points in both rounds of eliminations.

Cameroonian center Steve Akomo recorded the most rebounds made in a game twice when he hauled down 20 boards against the UP Fighting Maroons on October 11 and against the UE Red Warriors on November 12, both in the second round of eliminations. In the game against UE, the Tigers compiled a league-best total of 11 shot blocks, with six coming from Akomo.

UST also came in first with team averages of 45.9 rebounds and with 4.4 shot blocks per game.

Roster

Depth chart

Roster changes 
The Growling Tigers' three starting seniors, Louie Vigil, Jon Sheriff and Kent Lao have already graduated, while Mario Bonleon and Renzo Subido both dropped out of the roster to play in the PBA D-League.

UST has eight new players in their roster, composed of four transferees and four rookies that includes former UST Tiger Cubs team captain Jorem Soriano, who last played in 2012. He was set to join the seniors team in 2013, but personal and family matters kept him away from basketball. He returned to the team last year and was included in the Tigers' Team B training pool.

Subtractions

Additions

Coaching staff 
Boy Sablan went into his second year as the head coach of the Growling Tigers after signing a one-year contract extension in June 2017.

Former PBA players Gerry Esplana and Bobby Jose replaced Patrick Fran and Rabbi Tomacruz as assistant coaches going into Season 80.

Esplana, who was a former player of the FEU Tamaraws was the head coach of the Emilio Aguinaldo College Generals from 2011 until 2014, while the former Glowing Goldie Bobby Jose is an aspiring public servant in his hometown of Bocaue, Bulacan. Both of them have children who also play basketball for the varsity teams of their respective schools.

Ineligibility issues 
Steve Akomo became the subject of an eligibility probe in September 2017. In the days leading to the opening of the Season 80 men's basketball tournament, the UAAP board had insisted that Akomo needed two years for his transfer residency. He had transferred from the University of the Visayas and did his residency last season. They had cited the case of Ben Mbala, the Cameroonian player of La Salle who underwent two years of residency when he transferred from the Southwestern University in 2013. Sablan countered that former Growling Tiger and fellow Cameroonian Karim Abdul only did one year of residency before he was allowed to play for the team in 2011.

In spite of the Republic Act 10676, or the Student-Athletes Protection Act of 2015, a law that put an end to the Jerie Pingoy Rule,  or the 2013 UAAP rule which required two years of residency for all incoming collegiate athletes who wished to transfer from another UAAP member university, there appears to be another existing rule specifically made for foreign student-athletes. If the foreign student has attended high school in the Philippines for at least one school year, then he only has to do one year of residency. If he studied for two years, he could play already in college. Otherwise, the two-year residency requirement remains.

While the league's Board of Managing Directors had recommended Akomo, together with UP Fighting Maroon Ibrahim Ouattara to be ruled ineligible for the season's upcoming tournament, the UAAP Board of Trustees, the official policy-making body made up of the presidents of all-member schools had a meeting at FEU on September 7, 2017 and arrived at a decision "in the interest of justice and fairness," to allow both foreigners to play with finality.

Injuries 
Steve Akoma and Jordan Sta. Ana missed the game against FEU in the second round as Akomo was saddled with the flu, while Sta. Ana had a shoulder injury that he suffered in practice prior to the said match.

Close calls
The Growling Tigers on numerous occasions had chances to steal wins from their higher-ranked opponents, but either turnovers, poor free throws, or simply, bad breaks almost always did them in. Against the UP Fighting Maroons in the first round, UST lost by a single point, on a game-winning three point shot by Paul Desiderio during the last 5 seconds. This was when the iconic "Atin 'to, papasok ito" quote was first mentioned by the Fighting Maroons' captain. They lost again to UP in the second round, with a similar disappointing outcome. UST came to within 2 points with 9 seconds left, but team captain Marvin Lee missed a last-second heave, causing the team to lose for the eighth straight time.

Against the Adamson Falcons in the second round, the Tigers came to within 2 with 14 seconds left in the game, but fouls got the better of them. Fil-American guard Jerrick Ahanmisi converted his free throws for the final score of 70–75.

In their only win of the season against UE on their last scheduled game, the Tigers had to rely on perfect free throw shooting by second-year point guard Oli de Guzman to bail them to the final score of 88–85.

In their first-round game against Adamson, UST committed 41 turnovers, the most by any team in a single game since 2003, when record-keeping of UAAP statistics first became official.

Last man standing 
Having the reputation as being one of the most passionate sports fans in the country, the UST community's absence in the gallery became more noticeable as the crowd dwindled down to around fifty people that included the school's drummers and cheering squad. This absence was emphasized on October 25 after the Tigers lost their 11th straight game of the season, cameras were focused on a lone UST student at the stands singing their school hymn. This particular report awakened the community as students trooped back to the Araneta Coliseum in support of the team on the last playing game of the season on November 12. The iconic "Go USTe!" chant was once again heard for the first time after three months.

Schedule and results

Preseason tournaments 

The Filoil Flying V Preseason games were not aired on television for the first time in the tournament's history after the organizers' partnership with ABS-CBN Sports had ended.

UAAP games 

Elimination games were played in a double round-robin format. All games were aired on ABS-CBN Sports and Action and Balls.

Notes

UAAP statistics 

|- bgcolor=#ffffdd
| Steve Akomo || 12 || 10 || style=|27.3 || 52 || 104 || style=|50.0% || 0 || 4 || 0.0% || 33 || 69 || 47.8% || style=|13.2 || 1.7 || 0.9 || style=|2.5 || 3.8 || style=|11.4
|-
| Marvin Lee || 12 || 6 || 26.0 || 50 || 118 || 42.4% || 17 || 51 || 33.3% || 19 || 23 || 82.6% || 3.3 || 2.9 || style=|1.3 || 0.1 || 4.4 || 11.3
|- bgcolor=#ffffdd
| Jordan Sta. Ana || 13 || 11 || 25.1 || 60 || 129 || 46.5% || 0 || 1 || 0.0% || 24 || 57 || 42.1% || 2.4 || style=|4.3 || 0.8 || 0.0 || 3.6 || 11.1
|-
| Jeepy Faundo || 13 || 3 || 19.7 || 41 || 97 || 42.3% || 0 || 1 || 0.0% || 23 || 36 || 63.9% || 8.2 || 0.4 || 0.3 || 0.5 || 1.2 || 8.1
|- bgcolor=#ffffdd
| Regie Boy Basibas || 11 || 9 || 15.6 || 31 || 73 || 42.5% || 2 || 10 || 20.0% || 17 || 25 || 68.0% || 3.7 || 0.9 || 0.5 || 0.2 || 2.1 || 7.4
|-
| Oli de Guzman || 12 || 6 || 17.6 || 29 || 91 || 31.9% || 5 || 28 || 17.9% || 3 || 6 || 50.0% || 2.4 || 2.1 || 0.1 || 0.0 || 2.0 || 5.5
|- bgcolor=#ffffdd
| Enric Caunan || 13 || 6 || 13.0 || 29 || 50 || 58.0% || 0 || 0 || 0.0% || 1 || 6 || 16.7% || 4.0 || 0.6 || 0.1 || 0.6 || 1.1 || 4.5
|-
| Justin Arana || 6 || 2 || 8.6 || 7 || 18 || 38.9% || 0 || 0 || 0.0% || 8 || 14 || 57.1% || 3.5 || 0.3 || 0.2 || 0.2 || 0.3 || 3.7
|- bgcolor=#ffffdd
| Carlo Escalambre || 12 || 2 || 9.5 || 17 || 56 || 30.4% || 7 || 32 || 21.9% || 2 || 7 || 28.6% || 1.1 || 0.4 || 0.2 || 0.1 || 0.8 || 3.6
|-
| Zach Huang || 11 || 3 || 9.3 || 13 || 37 || 35.1% || 0 || 0 || 0.0% || 8 || 15 || 53.3% || 1.9 || 0.2 || 0.5 || 0.0 || 1.5 || 3.1
|- bgcolor=#ffffdd
| Jorem Soriano || 12 || 2 || 9.6 || 8 || 23 || 34.8% || 2 || 5 || style=|40.0% || 13 || 22 || 59.1% || 1.9 || 0.6 || 0.1 || 0.2 || 1.1 || 2.6
|-
| Christian Garcia || 11 || 0 || 9.9 || 11 || 33 || 33.3% || 2 || 8 || 25.0% || 5 || 7 || 71.4% || 3.3 || 1.4 || 0.2 || 0.2 || 1.9 || 2.6
|- bgcolor=#ffffdd
| Joco Macasaet || 13 || 4 || 12.3 || 12 || 36 || 33.3% || 0 || 3 || 0.0% || 6 || 8 || 75.0% || 2.8 || 0.8 || 0.0 || 0.5 || 0.5 || 2.3
|-
| MR Romero || 12 || 2 || 9.6 || 8 || 18 || 44.4% || 0 || 0 || 0.0% || 2 || 3 || 66.7% || 1.3 || 0.3 || 0.1 || 0.2 || 1.0 || 1.5
|- bgcolor=#ffffdd
| Onzo Lorenzana || 5 || 2 || 3.9 || 1 || 4 || 25.0% || 1 || 4 || 25.0% || 2 || 2 || style=|100.0% || 1.2 || 0.2 || 0.0 || 0.0 || 1.2 || 1.0
|-
| Ben Kwawukumey || 11 || 1 || 4.9 || 5 || 14 || 35.7% || 0 || 0 || 0.0% || 0 || 0 || 0.0% || 0.7 || 0.1 || 0.2 || 0.0 || 1.1 || 0.9
|- class=sortbottom
! Total || 14 ||  || 40.0 || 374 || 901 || 41.5% || 36 || 148 || 24.3% || 166 || 300 || 55.3% || 45.9 || 14.7 || 4.4 || 4.4 || 23.4 || 67.9
|- class=sortbottom
! Opponents || 14 ||  || 40.0 || 415 || 982 || 42.3% || 101 || 306 || 33.0% || 188 || 270 || 69.6% || 40.4 || 19.5 || 9.4 || 4.4 || 15.5 || 79.9
|}

Source: HumbleBola

Aftermath 
Boy Sablan tendered his resignation as the team's head coach on November 20, 2017. UST Rector Fr. Herminio Dagohoy announced that the entire coaching staff's tenure was to end on November 30, but they will continue receiving compensations until May of the following year due to existing live contracts. The Tigresses assistant coach Arsenio Dysangco Jr. was tasked to facilitate team practices as the school was finalizing the process for selecting the Growling Tigers' next coach.

Former head coach Pido Jarencio once again expressed interest in coming back to lead the team, but there was someone else who was being considered for the position. On January 5, 2018, Aldin Ayo, resigned coach of the De La Salle Green Archers, announced his transfer to UST where he will coach the men's basketball team for the next six years. Ayo's appointment was made formal by Institute of Physical Education and Athletics (IPEA) director Fr. Jannel Abogado on January 11.

Awards

Players drafted into the PBA 
Jeepy Faundo was picked 15th overall in the second round of the 2018 PBA draft by the Chito Victolero-led Magnolia Hotshots team on December 16, 2018.

References 

2017–18 in Philippine college basketball
UST Growling Tigers basketball team seasons